Vice Admiral Stuart Campbell Mayer,  (born  1965) is a retired senior officer of the Royal Australian Navy. He joined the navy via the Royal Australian Naval College at HMAS Creswell in 1984 and qualified as a Principal Warfare Officer in 1994. He commanded  (2002–04),  (2007–09) and the International Stabilisation Force (2009–10), and deployed on operations to the Persian Gulf, East Timor, and the Arabian Sea during the Iraq War. He served as Commander Australian Fleet from 2014 to 2018, Head Force Design within the Vice Chief of Defence Force Group from 2018 to 2019, and Deputy Commander United Nations Command, based in South Korea, from 2019 to 2021. He retired from the navy in 2022 and was appointed a partner in Ernst & Young's consulting division.

Naval career

Early career
Mayer completed the Higher School Certificate in 1983 at North Sydney Boys High School.
 
In 1993 Mayer commenced training as a Principal Warfare Officer (Direction) and graduated with distinction in 1994.
 
In January 2000 Mayer was promoted to commander and posted to the United States as the first ADF Liaison officer to US Joint Forces Command based in Norfolk, Virginia. Mayer returned from the United States in mid-2002 and assumed command of HMAS Canberra, continuing an association with that ship that included service in every rank from trainee to commanding officer.
 
Mayer left HMAS Canberra in July 2004 and was promoted to the rank of captain and assumed the position of Chief Staff Officer (Operations) at Maritime Headquarters (MHQ) Australia in January 2005.  While posted to MHQ, Mayer was seconded to the Australian Maritime Deployable HQ staff for duties as Commander Task Group 58.1 – Northern Arabian Gulf Maritime Security Operations Commander. Mayer was awarded a Commendation for Distinguished Service for his "distinguished performance" in this role. Mayer returned to MHQ in October 2005, resuming duties as Chief Staff Officer (Operations). His "outstanding achievement" while with MHQ led to the award of a Conspicuous Service Cross (CSC) in 2008.

Senior commands
In January 2007 Mayer attended the Australian Defence College and read for a Master of Arts in Strategic Studies. He assumed command of the frigate  in December 2007 and completed deployments to exercise RIMPAC and to Southeast Asia as the Commander of the RAN Task Group. Mayer left Anzac in mid-2009, was promoted to commodore and appointed Commander of the multi-national International Stabilisation Force (ISF) in East Timor on 24 October 2009. The first non-army officer to hold this command, Mayer demonstrated "inspirational leadership and initiative, and outstanding dedication to duty in [a] stable but fragile security environment" during his six-month deployment, for which he was awarded a Bar to his CSC and the East Timorese Medal of Merit.

On Mayer's return to Australia in April 2010, he assumed duties as Commodore Flotillas at Fleet Headquarters. Promoted to rear admiral, he was appointed Commander Australian Fleet on 12 June 2014. In recognition of his "selfless devotion to duty and outstanding achievement" in these senior roles, Mayer was made an Officer of the Order of Australia in the 2017 Australia Day Honours. He relinquished command of the Australian Fleet to Rear Admiral Jonathan Mead in January 2018 and was appointed as Head Force Design within the Vice Chief of Defence Force Group from March.

In April 2019 it was announced that Mayer would be appointed Deputy Commander United Nations Command in South Korea later in the year. He relinquished Head Force Design in June and, promoted vice admiral on 18 July, succeeded Lieutenant General Wayne Eyre of the Canadian Army as Deputy Commander on 28 July. He was the second non-American (after Eyre) and first Australian to hold the post in the 69-year history of United Nations Command. Mayer relinquished the post on 15 December 2021. For his work with United Nations Command, Mayer was awarded an Officer of the United States Legion of Merit.

Mayer is a graduate of the Australian Institute of Company Directors, holds a Bachelor of Arts from the University of New South Wales, a Master of Arts from Deakin University, and a Master of Business Administration from the University of Southern Queensland.

Post-military career
Following his retirement from the RAN in 2022, Mayer was appointed a partner in the consulting division at Ernst & Young Australia.

Personal life
Mayer is married to Susanne, with whom he has four children. Mayer's interests include rugby, sailing, bushwalking and kayaking.

References

|-

|-

Australian military personnel of the Gulf War
Australian military personnel of the International Force for East Timor
Australian military personnel of the Iraq War
Australian recipients of the Meritorious Service Medal (United States)
Deakin University alumni
Living people
Officers of the Legion of Merit
Officers of the Order of Australia
People educated at North Sydney Boys High School
Recipients of the Commendation for Distinguished Service
Recipients of the Conspicuous Service Cross (Australia)
Recipients of the Meritorious Unit Citation
Royal Australian Navy admirals
University of New South Wales alumni
University of Southern Queensland alumni
Year of birth missing (living people)